Kalmyk, "Kalmuck", "Kalmuk", or "Kalmyki"' may refer to:

Kalmyk people or Kalmyks, a group of western Mongolic people
Kalmyk language, the language of the Kalmyk people
Kalmykia, a Russian republic
Kalmyk Khanate, a historic state
Kalmyk cattle, beef cattle breed originating with Kalmyk people
Kalmyk horse, horse breed originating with the Kalmyk people

See also
Operation Kalmyk, a 2012 British police operation

Language and nationality disambiguation pages